Calymene celebra is a Silurian species of trilobites of the order Phacopida and also the state fossil of Wisconsin. It is found in Illinois, Indiana, and Wisconsin.

References

Calymenidae
Paleontology in Illinois
Paleontology in Wisconsin
Paleontology in Indiana

Fossil taxa described in 1916
Symbols of Wisconsin